Oxyporus rufus is a species of beetle belonging to the large family of the rove beetles (Staphylinidae).

Description 

The body is massive and wide, colored with black and orange. The imposing scimitar-like mandibles do not fall back close to the rest of the head. The head, the hind margin of the elytra, and the apex of the abdomen are black. The thorax, the visible segments of abdomen, and the first half of the very short elytra are orange. The antenna are orange as well, the last 7 segments being thicker and shorter forming a slight cob.

Similar species 
A similar species is Oxyporus maxillosus, which elytra are yellow and only black at the hind corner.

Synonyme 
 Oxyporus minarzi Author: Bernhauer, 1923
 Staphylinus nigrofulvus Author: Geoffroy, 1785

References

Staphylinidae
Beetles of Europe
Beetles described in 1758
Taxa named by Carl Linnaeus